The 1906 Vanderbilt Elimination Race was a motor race run to decide which five cars would represent the United States in the international 1906 Vanderbilt Cup. 

The race was run on September 22, 1906, over ten laps on a 29-mile course near Westbury, Long Island, New York. "Crowded excursion trains followed one another from midnight until long after the race had started, discharging thousands at Mineola, Westbury, Hicksville and other stations about the course. Country people from miles around journeyed to the course until the multitude numbered more than 100,000. At least 5,000 automobiles, carrying gay parties of men and women lined the course." The race started at 06:00 in the morning with cars leaving at one-minute intervals. Mongini, Matheson, burst a tire on the first lap, hitting a telephone pole. He and his mechanic Green were thrown from the car but suffered only bruising. When Tracy crossed the finish line the race was stopped due to the crowd invading the circuit.

The following team was chosen to represent America: Joseph Tracy (90-hp. Locomobile), Hubert LeBlon (115-hp. Thomas), H.N. Harding (50-hp. Haynes), Frank Lawell (110-hp. Frayer-Miller), and J. Walter Christie (50-hp. Christie). "Only the first three covered the full course, and Lawell and Christie were given places on the team; the former owing to the fact that he was still running when the race was called off, and the latter owing to the disqualification of Lyttle (Pope-Toledo), for being towed." During the elimination contest: "Lawell was closely pressing Christie for the fifth place."

Classification

References

Vanderbilt Elimination Race
Vanderbilt Elimination Race
Vanderbilt Cup
Vanderbilt Elimination Race